This is a list of species within the chalcid wasp genus Copidosoma

Copidosoma species

 Copidosoma abulense Mercet, 1921
 Copidosoma aeneum Sharkov, 1985
 Copidosoma aeripes (Girault, 1932)
 Copidosoma agrotis (Fonscolombe, 1832)
 Copidosoma aithyia (Walker, 1837)
 Copidosoma albipes (Westwood, 1837)
 Copidosoma alhagiae Myartseva, 1983
 Copidosoma amarginalia Li and Ma, 2007
 Copidosoma amurense Sharkov, 1988
 Copidosoma anceus (Walker, 1837)
 Copidosoma ancharus (Walker, 1837)
 Copidosoma aptera Japoshvili (unavailable name in current taxon)
 Copidosoma archeodominica Zuparko and Trjapitzin, 2014
 Copidosoma arenarium Erdos, 1961
 Copidosoma arenicola (Trjapitzin, 1967)
 Copidosoma aretas (Walker, 1838)
 Copidosoma arvense Myartseva, 1983
 Copidosoma athepi Guerrieri and Noyes, 2005
 Copidosoma augasmatis Trjapitzin, 1968
 Copidosoma auriceps (Ashmead, 1900)
 Copidosoma australia Girault, 1917
 Copidosoma australicum Girault, 1917
 Copidosoma australis Girault, 1917
 Copidosoma autumnale Myartseva, 1983
 Copidosoma babas (Walker, 1837)
 Copidosoma baii Zhang and Huang, 2007
 Copidosoma bakeri (Howard, 1898)
 Copidosoma balchanense Myartseva, 1983
 Copidosoma bicoloricornis (Girault, 1915)
 Copidosoma bohemicum (Hoffer, 1960)
 Copidosoma bolivari Mercet, 1921
 Copidosoma boreale Hoffer, 1970
 Copidosoma bouceki Kazmi and Hayat, 1998
 Copidosoma boucheanum Ratzeburg, 1844
 Copidosoma breviclava Hoffer, 1970
 Copidosoma brevitruncatellum Kazmi and Hayat, 1998
 Copidosoma breviusculum Hoffer, 1980
 Copidosoma bucculatricis (Howard, 1892)
 Copidosoma bucharicum Myartseva, 1983
 Copidosoma budense Erdos, 1955
 Copidosoma calligoni Myartseva, 1983
 Copidosoma caspicum Myartseva, 1983
 Copidosoma celaenae Howard, 1885
 Copidosoma cercobelus Ratzeburg (unavailable name in current taxon)
 Copidosoma cervius (Walker, 1846)
 Copidosoma chalconotum (Dalman, 1820)
 Copidosoma charon Guerrieri and Noyes, 2005
 Copidosoma chilense (Brethes, 1921)
 Copidosoma clavatum Myartseva, 1982
 Copidosoma coimbatorense Kazmi and Hayat, 1998
 Copidosoma compressiventris Girault, 1915
 Copidosoma coni (Trjapitzin, Voinovich and Sharkov, 1987)
 Copidosoma convexum Ishii, 1928
 Copidosoma cubense Lopez, 2003
 Copidosoma cuproviride Springate and Noyes, 1990
 Copidosoma cyaneum Hoffer, 1970
 Copidosoma dasi Hayat, 2003
 Copidosoma deceptor Miller, 1958
 Copidosoma delattrei (Ghesquiere, 1948)
 Copidosoma dendrophilum Myartseva, 1983
 Copidosoma desantisi Annecke and Mynhardt, 1974
 Copidosoma dioryctria Dang and Wang, 2002
 Copidosoma distinctum Szelenyi, 1982
 Copidosoma dius (Walker, 1837)
 Copidosoma dudichi Szelenyi, 1982
 Copidosoma dushakense Myartseva, 1983
 Copidosoma eucalypti (Dodd, 1917)
 Copidosoma eurystomum Kazmi and Hayat, 2012
 Copidosoma exiguum Kazmi and Hayat, 1998
 Copidosoma exortivum Sharkov, 1988
 Copidosoma extraneum (Hoffer, 1970)
 Copidosoma exvallis Noyes, 1988
 Copidosoma fadus (Walker, 1838)
 Copidosoma falkovitshi Myartseva, 1983
 Copidosoma farabense Myartseva, 1983
 Copidosoma fasciatum (Girault, 1913)
 Copidosoma filicorne (Dalman, 1820)
 Copidosoma firli Guerrieri and Noyes, 2005
 Copidosoma flagellare (Dalman, 1820)
 Copidosoma floridanum (Ashmead, 1900)
 Copidosoma fulgens Sharkov, 1985
 Copidosoma fuscisquama (Thomson, 1876)
 Copidosoma gelechiae Howard, 1885
 Copidosoma genale (Thomson, 1876)
 Copidosoma gibbosum Sharkov, 1988
 Copidosoma gloriosum (Mercet, 1917)
 Copidosoma gracile (Kaul and Agarwal, 1986)
 Copidosoma graminis Noyes, 1989
 Copidosoma hanzhongenum Dang and Wang, 2002
 Copidosoma heinitane Li and Wang, 2018
 Copidosoma herbaceum Mercet, 1921
 Copidosoma herbicola Sharkov, 1988
 Copidosoma hispanicum (Mercet, 1921)
 Copidosoma hofferi (Sharkov, 1985)
 Copidosoma horaxis Kazmi and Hayat, 1998
 Copidosoma howardi Zolnerowich and Zuparko, 2010
 Copidosoma howardi Zolnerowich and Zuparko, 2011
 Copidosoma hyalinistigma De Santis, 1964
 Copidosoma ilaman Kazmi and Hayat, 1998
 Copidosoma indicum Kazmi and Hayat, 1998
 Copidosoma insulare (Timberlake, 1941)
 Copidosoma intermedium Howard, 1885
 Copidosoma iole (Trjapitzin, 1967)
 Copidosoma ipswichia (Girault, 1923)
 Copidosoma iracundum Erdos, 1957
 Copidosoma iridescens Sharkov, 1985
 Copidosoma isfahani Japoshvili, 2016
 Copidosoma javense (Girault, 1919)
 Copidosoma jucundum Kazmi and Hayat, 1998
 Copidosoma juliae Myartseva, 1986
 Copidosoma katuniense (Litvinchuk and Trjapitzin, 1979)
 Copidosoma kirghizicum Myartseva, 1983
 Copidosoma koehleri Blanchard, 1940
 Copidosoma komabae (Ishii, 1923)
 Copidosoma kuhitangense Myartseva, 1983
 Copidosoma kushkense Myartseva, 1983
 Copidosoma lepidopterophagum (Girault, 1915)
 Copidosoma linzhiensis Li and Wang, 2018
 Copidosoma longchuane Li and Wang, 2018
 Copidosoma longiartus (Girault, 1932)
 Copidosoma longicaudata Japoshvili and Guerrieri, 2013
 Copidosoma longiclavatum Kazmi and Hayat, 1998
 Copidosoma longiventre Myartseva, 1983
 Copidosoma lotae (Girault, 1923)
 Copidosoma lucetius (Walker, 1839)
 Copidosoma lucidum Kazmi and Hayat, 1998
 Copidosoma luciphilum (Sharkov, 1985)
 Copidosoma lymani Howard, 1907
 Copidosoma malacosoma Dang and Wang, 2002
 Copidosoma manaliense Kazmi and Hayat, 1998
 Copidosoma manilae (Ashmead, 1904)
 Copidosoma melanocephalum Ashmead, 1886 (unavailable name in current taxon)   
 Copidosoma melanocerum (Ashmead, 1900)
 Copidosoma meridionale (Kazmi and Hayat, 1998)
 Copidosoma minutum (Herthevtzian, 1979)
 Copidosoma mohelnense Hoffer, 1970
 Copidosoma monochroum Hoffer, 1970
 Copidosoma myartsevae Sharkov, 1988
 Copidosoma nacoleiae (Eady, 1960)
 Copidosoma naevia Saether, 1966
 Copidosoma naurzumense Sharkov, Katzner and Bragina, 2003
 Copidosoma nekrasovi Trjapitzin, 1998
 Copidosoma nepalense (Kazmi, 1997)
 Copidosoma nijasovi Myartseva, 1981
 Copidosoma nocturnum Sharkov, 1985
 Copidosoma notatum Kazmi and Hayat, 1998
 Copidosoma noyesi Kazmi and Hayat, 1998
 Copidosoma nubilosum Sharkov, 1988
 Copidosoma oreinos Kazmi and Hayat, 1998
 Copidosoma orientale (Yu and Zhang, 2010)
 Copidosoma ortyx Guerrieri and Noyes, 2005
 Copidosoma paralios (Sharkov, 1985)
 Copidosoma parkeri (Girault, 1932)
 Copidosoma perminutum (Girault, 1915)
 Copidosoma perpunctatum Szelenyi, 1982
 Copidosoma perseverans (Girault, 1915)
 Copidosoma peticus (Walker, 1846)
 Copidosoma phaloniae Zhang and Huang, 2007
 Copidosoma phthorimaeae Logvinovskaya, 1982
 Copidosoma pilosum Szelenyi, 1982
 Copidosoma pistacinellae Hoffer, 1970
 Copidosoma plethoricum (Caltagirone, 1966)
 Copidosoma primulum (Mercet, 1921)
 Copidosoma pyralidis (Ashmead, 1888)
 Copidosoma radnense Erdos, 1957
 Copidosoma rarum Kazmi and Hayat, 1998
 Copidosoma ratzeburgi Mercet, 1921
 Copidosoma recurvariae Sharkov, 1988
 Copidosoma remotum Sharkov, 1988
 Copidosoma salacon (Walker, 1839)
 Copidosoma sashegyense Erdos, 1957
 Copidosoma saxaulicum Myartseva, 1983
 Copidosoma scutellare (Hoffer, 1970)
 Copidosoma serricorne (Dalman, 1820)
 Copidosoma shakespearei Girault, 1923
 Copidosoma shawi Guerrieri and Noyes, 2005
 Copidosoma silvestrii (Costa Lima, 1953)
 Copidosoma sinevi Sharkov, 1988
 Copidosoma slavai Myartseva, 1983
 Copidosoma songinum (Hoffer, 1970)
 Copidosoma sosares (Walker, 1837)
 Copidosoma spinosum Kazmi and Hayat, 1998
 Copidosoma splendidum Foerster (unavailable name in current taxon)
 Copidosoma stylatum (Thomson, 1876)
 Copidosoma subalbicorne (Hoffer, 1960)
 Copidosoma tamilanum Kazmi and Hayat, 2014
 Copidosoma tanytmemum (Caltagirone, 1985)
 Copidosoma teciae (Blanchard, 1940)
 Copidosoma tenue Szelenyi, 1982
 Copidosoma terebrator Mayr, 1876
 Copidosoma thebe (Walker, 1838)
 Copidosoma thompsoni Mercet, 1925
 Copidosoma tibiale Hoffer, 1970
 Copidosoma transversum Kazmi and Hayat, 1998
 Copidosoma tremblayi Guerrieri and Noyes, 2006
 Copidosoma trisegmentis (Xu, 2000)
 Copidosoma trjapitzini Simutnik, 2007
 Copidosoma truncatellum (Dalman, 1820)
 Copidosoma tugaicum Myartseva, 1983
 Copidosoma turanicum Myartseva, 1983
 Copidosoma ultimum Sharkov, 1988
 Copidosoma uruguayensis Tachikawa, 1968
 Copidosoma uruguayensis Tachnikawa, 1968
 Copidosoma varicorne (Nees, 1834)
 Copidosoma variventris (Girault, 1925)
 Copidosoma venustum Sharkov, 1988
 Copidosoma vicinum (Herthevtzian, 1979)
 Copidosoma vinnulum Kazmi and Hayat, 1998
 Copidosoma virescens De Santis, 1972
 Copidosoma viridiaeneum Hoffer, 1970
 Copidosoma zdeneki Guerrieri and Noyes, 2005
 Copidosoma zolta Guerrieri and Noyes, 2005

References

Encyrtinae
Hymenoptera genera
Copidosoma